Arantxa Sánchez Vicario and Jared Palmer were the defending champions, but lost in the quarterfinals to Ai Sugiyama and Ellis Ferreira.

Rennae Stubbs and Todd Woodbridge won the title by defeating Lisa Raymond and Leander Paes 6–4, 5–7, [11–9] in the final.

Seeds

Draw

Finals

Top half

Bottom half

References
 Official Results Archive (WTA)
2001 US Open – Doubles draws and results at the International Tennis Federation

2001 US Open (tennis)
2001 US Open - Mixed Doubles
2001 US Open - Mixed Doubles
US Open (tennis) by year – Mixed doubles